Catalpa is Jolie Holland's debut album from 2003. The tracks were recorded in the living room of one of the band members with the intention of distributing the recordings among their friends. Inevitably, copies of the recordings were passed from person to person and demand increased for a commercial release of the album. Catalpa was initially released on the Anti Records label and distributed through CDbaby.com. In 2003, the San Francisco Chronicle chose Catalpa as one of the 10 best albums of that year.

Track listing 
All tracks written by Jolie Holland except where noted.

 "Alley Flowers" – 5:02
 "All the Morning Birds" – 4:23
 "Roll My Blues" (Mike Good) – 4:06
 "Black Hand Blues" – 2:55
 "December, 1999" – 3:36
 "I Wanna Die" – 5:19
 "Demon Lover Improv" – 4:32
 "Catalpa Waltz" – 5:08
 "The Littlest Birds" (Syd Barrett, Holland, Samantha Parton) – 3:59
 "Wandering Angus" (Holland, Miller Brian, William B. Yeats) – 7:22
 "Periphery Waltz" – 4:06
 "Ghost Waltz" – 3:50

Personnel 
 Jolie Holland – vocals, guitar, drum
 David Mihaly – drum, bells
 Enzo Garcia – harmonica, muted banjo
 Chris Arnold – musical saw, percussion
 Samantha Parton – harmonies
 Brian Miller – electric guitar

References 

2003 debut albums
Jolie Holland albums